The Montreal River is a  river on the Keweenaw Peninsula of the U.S. state of Michigan. The Montreal River contains several rare plants and habitat, falls, and archeological sites; the lower portion of the Montreal River to Smith Fisheries is lowland conifer and contains steep slopes. There are three major waterfalls, and several smaller rapids.

In 2002, the state of Michigan purchased  in a two-phase acquisition.

References

Rivers of Michigan
Rivers of Keweenaw County, Michigan
Tributaries of Lake Superior